Pawan Singh is an Indian playback singer, actor and musician.

Pawan Singh may also refer to:

Pawan Singh (coach), Indian former rifle shooter and coach of the Indian shooting team
Pawan Singh (footballer) (born 2003), Fijian football player 
Pawan Singh (politician), Indian politician from West Bengal